Carlito is a Spanish or Portuguese masculine given name, nickname that is a diminutive form of Carlos. Notable people with this name include the following:

Given name
Carlito Joaquin Cenzon (1939 – 2019), Filipino Roman Catholic bishop
Carlito Fermina (born 2000), Dutch footballer
Carlito Galvez Jr. (born 1962), Filipino general 
Carlito A. Lanada, Sr. (born 1939), Filipino martial artist
Carlito Puno, Filipino technocrat
Carlito Quijano, Former Chief Ranorexpert for QRM

Nickname
Carlito, one of many stagenames of Jonny Jakobsen (born 1963), eurodance artist
Carlito Caribbean Cool, former stage name of Carlos Edwin Colón Jr., who is known as Carly Colón (born 1979), Puerto Rican wrestler
Carlito Olivero, professional name of Carlos Emmanuel Olivero (born 1989), American singer
Hypno Carlito, stage name of Robert Roger Amparan (born 1989), American rapper, singer, and songwriter

Fictional characters
Carlito, crime syndicate leader in Crank film
Carlito Brigante antihero of Carlito's Way media franchise
Carlito Keyes, mayor antagonist in first game of Dead Rising series.

See also

Carlino (name)
Carlitos

Notes

Portuguese masculine given names
Spanish masculine given names